Ohio Vortex was an American professional indoor soccer team based in Canton, Ohio. They joined the Professional Arena Soccer League in 2009. The Ohio Vortex was a non-profit organization that donates a portion of their revenue to local charities.  The team was founded by former Canton Invaders player Nick Bogdan.

The Ohio Vortex ended their inaugural season 8-8.  The club was coached by Canton Invaders legend Denzil Antonio.  The team shut down after the 2012–13 season.

Year-by-year

History 
The Ohio Vortex could have continued the tradition that its predecessor had by calling themselves the Canton Invaders. However, founder Nick Bogdan wanted a unique name and not one that has been recycled by other sports teams. The team got its Vortex name as a result of the charity work that it does.  He called the team the Vortex because the team plays for a variety of charities that pull people in from all over the state to help support the causes.

The Vortex began play in the 2009–10 season at the Cleveland Metroplex Events Center in Warrensville Heights, Ohio, before settling into the Canton Civic Center in Canton, Ohio. On October 26, 2012, the team announced it was moving to Oberlin, Ohio and play their home games at the Gameday Sports Center. The team then relocated to the Pinnacle Sports Complex in Medina, Ohio, after the first two home games. The team folded after the 2012–13 season.

Mission 
A portion of proceeds from every ticket sold to a Vortex game will be given to diverse local non-profit organizations that work for the greater good. At the end of their inaugural season, approximately $10,000 was given to charities in Northeast Ohio.

Arenas
 Canton Civic Center, Canton, Ohio (2009-2012)
 Gameday Sports Center, Oberlin, Ohio (2012)
 Pinnacle Sports Complex, Medina, Ohio (2012–2013)

References

External links 
 

 

2009 establishments in Ohio
Association football clubs established in 2009
Defunct indoor soccer clubs in the United States
Defunct Professional Arena Soccer League teams
Indoor soccer clubs in the United States
Medina, Ohio
Sports in Canton, Ohio
Soccer clubs in Ohio
Association football clubs disestablished in 2013
2013 disestablishments in Ohio